KIXW may refer to:

 KIXW-FM, a radio station (107.3 FM) licensed to Lenwood, California, United States
 KIXW (AM), a radio station (960 AM) licensed to Apple Valley, California, United States